Vladyslav Serhiyovych Supryaha (born 15 February 2000) is a Ukrainian professional footballer who plays as a forward for Ukrainian club Dynamo Kyiv.

Club career

Dnipro and Dnipro-1
Supryaha is a product of Dnipro youth teams, and started making bench appearances for the senior squad in the 2016–17 season. Following the relegation of Dnipro into the third tier after the 2016–17 season due to financial irregularities, he switched to Dnipro-1. He made his Ukrainian Second League debut for Dnipro-1 on 15 July 2017, in a game against Metalist 1925 Kharkiv as a 61st-minute substitute for Vladyslav Voytsekhovskyi.

Dynamo Kyiv
On 10 August 2018, Supryaha signed a five-year contract with the Ukrainian Premier League club Dynamo Kyiv. He made his league debut for Dynamo Kyiv on 25 August 2018, in a game against Chornomorets Odesa as an 82nd-minute substitute for Nazariy Rusyn. He started the next Dynamo's game, a Champions League play-off return leg against Ajax on 28 August.

Loan to Sampdoria
On 30 January 2022, Supryaha was sent on loan to Sampdoria in the Serie A. On 6 February 2022, he made his home debut with the new club against Sassuolo in the 2021–22 season, replacing Manolo Gabbiadini in the 36th minute.

International career
Supryaha represented Ukraine U17 at the 2017 UEFA European Under-17 Championship, Ukraine did not advance out of the group.

At the 2018 UEFA European Under-19 Championship, Ukraine U19 advanced to the semifinal. Despite only scoring once, Supryaha was selected for team of the tournament at the central forward position. In the 2019 FIFA U-20 World Cup, Ukraine won their first-ever FIFA tournament title; Supryaha scored twice in the final en route to a 3–1 victory over South Korea.

Career statistics

Honours
Dynamo Kyiv
 Ukrainian Premier League: 2020–21
 Ukrainian Cup: 2020–21
 Ukrainian Super Cup: 2020

Ukraine U20
 FIFA U-20 World Cup: 2019

Individual
 Golden talent of Ukraine: 2020
 Ukrainian Premier League Best young player: 2019–20

References

External links
 
 

2000 births
Living people
People from Sarata
Ukrainian footballers
Association football forwards
FC Dnipro players
SC Dnipro-1 players
FC Dynamo Kyiv players
U.C. Sampdoria players
Ukrainian Second League players
Ukrainian Premier League players
Serie A players
Ukraine youth international footballers
Ukraine under-21 international footballers
Ukrainian expatriate footballers
Ukrainian expatriate sportspeople in Italy
Expatriate footballers in Italy
Sportspeople from Odesa Oblast